HMS Racehorse was a three-funnel, 30-knot torpedo boat destroyer built by Hawthorn Leslie for the Royal Navy. Ordered by the Royal Navy under the 1898–1899 Naval Estimates, she was the eighth ship to carry this name since it was introduced in 1757.  She served in World War I and was sold for breaking in 1920.

Construction
She was laid down on 23 October 1899  at the R.W. Hawthorn Leslie and Company shipyard at Hebburn-on-Tyne and launched on 8 November 1900.  During her builder's trials she made her contract speed of 30 knots.  She was completed and accepted by the Royal Navy in March 1902.

Service
After commissioning she was assigned to the Channel Fleet. She spent her operational career mainly in home waters. In May 1902 she received the officers and men from HMS Mermaid, and was commissioned at Chatham by Commander John Green for service with the Medway Instructional Flotilla. She took part in the fleet review held at Spithead on 16 August 1902 for the coronation of King Edward VII. In 1909 she was assigned to the 2nd Flotilla at Portland under the command of Lieutenant G B Hartford.

On 30 August 1912 the Admiralty directed all destroyer classes were to be designated by letters.  Since her design speed was 30-knots and she had three funnels she was assigned with similar vessels to the C class.  After 30 September 1913, she was known as a C-class destroyer and had the letter ‘C’ painted on the hull below the bridge area and on either the fore or aft funnel.

By July 1914 she was in the 6th Destroyer Flotilla tendered to HMS Attentive based at Dover.  While employed in the 6th Flotilla she performed anti-submarine and counter-mining patrols as well as Dover Barrage defensive patrols. On 28 October 1914 under the command of Lieutenant E P U Pender, she was part of the anti-submarine screen for operations off the Belgian coast.

In 1919 she was paid off and laid-up in reserve awaiting disposal. She was sold on 23 March 1920 to M Yates for breaking at Milford Haven. She was awarded the battle honour Belgian Coast 1915 – 16 for her service.

Pennant numbers

References

Bibliography
 

 

Ships built on the River Tyne
1900 ships
C-class destroyers (1913)
World War I destroyers of the United Kingdom
Greyhound-class destroyers